Tatar-e Sofla (also Romanized as Tātār-e Soflá; also known as Perebay-Tatar, Pirabai, Pīrehbāy, and Tātār-e Pā’īn) is a village in Minjavan-e Sharqi Rural District, Minjavan District, Khoda Afarin County, East Azerbaijan Province, Iran. At the 2006 census, its population was 348, in 84 families.

Situation
The online edition of the Dehkhoda Dictionary, quoting Iranian Army files, reports a population of 195 people in late 1940s. At the 2006 census, its population was 348, in 84 families.    According to a more recent statistics (2012) the population is 271 people in 84 families. This indicates a sharp decline in population, perhaps due to the migration of young people in the pursuit of jobs in larger cities.

Before the Iranian Revolution, A small contingent of the Royal Gendarmerie was located in village with the task of guarding the borders with the Soviet Union, conscripting local males, and settling the disputes between villagers and nomadic pastoralists.

References 

Populated places in Khoda Afarin County